Creedia bilineata is a species of sandburrowers found in the Northwest Pacific Ocean around Japan.

Etymology
The sandburrower is named because it has two lines on the sides of the fish.

References

Creediidae
Fish of Japan
Taxa named by Kazuhiko Shimada
Taxa named by Tetsuo Yoshino
Fish described in 1987